Stand by to Shoot was a British television serial which aired 1953 on the BBC, written by Donald Wilson and produced by Dennis Vance. It was set at a film studio. The series was broadcast live in six episodes, none of which are believed to have been recorded.

Scheduling
The first episode aired on a schedule which also included the film Road Show, children's series Whirligig, newsreels, and an outside broadcast on the making of cricket bats. The final episode aired on a schedule which also included cricket, athletics, The Appleyards, and newsreels.

References

External links
Stand by to Shoot

1950s British television miniseries
1950s British drama television series
1953 British television series debuts
1953 British television series endings
Lost BBC episodes
BBC Television shows
Black-and-white British television shows
BBC television dramas